Chitrahaar is a television program on DD National featuring song clips from Bollywood films. It was widely watched in the 1980s and 1990s. The word literally means 'a garland of pictures', or more liberally, 'a story of pictures'.

History
Chitrahaar first aired in 1982.  In 1997, Chitrahaar went back to private producers, with Chitrahaar going to Amit Khanna of Plus Channel.

In 2010, Chitrahaar started using same language subtitling (SLS), where Hindi subtitles of the song's lyrics scroll across the screen. The idea behind SLS is that people who are just learning to read would benefit by reading lyrics of the songs they are listening to and watching. It is an engaging way to promote literacy, especially in villages. This initiative of Doordarshan has been technically supported by the Indian Institute of Management, Ahmedabad.

References

External links
 Article in the Indian Express on SLS 
Chitrahaar on IMDb

Hindi-language television shows
DD National original programming
1980s Indian television series
1990s Indian television series
2000s Indian television series
2010s Indian television series
1982 Indian television series debuts
Indian musical television series